Rich Phillips is an American radio personality based out of Dallas, Texas. He currently serves as a sports reporter for the popular "Dunham & Miller" radio show, heard weekday mornings from 5:30-10 on KTCK 1310 AM.

Phillips is the primary reporter for NASCAR-related material at KTCK. In 2001, he was named play by play commentator for the SMU Mustangs football radio broadcasts.

References

Year of birth missing (living people)
Living people
Radio personalities from Dallas
SMU Mustangs football announcers
College football announcers
Place of birth missing (living people)